Nikah halala, also known as tahleel marriage, is a practice in which a woman, after being divorced by triple talaq, marries another man, consummates the marriage, and gets divorced again in order to be able to remarry her former husband. Nikah means marriage and halala means to make something halal, or permissible. This form of marriage is haram (forbidden) according to the hadith of Islamic prophet Muhammad. Nikah halala is practiced by a small minority of Muslims, mainly in countries that recognise the triple talaq.

Islamic law

In classical Islamic law, a husband may divorce by simply announcing to his wife that he repudiates her (talaq). The initial declaration of talaq is a revocable repudiation (ṭalāq rajʿah) which does not terminate the marriage. The husband can revoke the divorce at any time during the waiting period (‘iddah) which lasts three full menstrual cycles. Resumption of sexual relations automatically retracts the repudiation. The divorce becomes final when the waiting period expires. This is called a "minor" divorce (al-baynuna al-sughra) and the couple can remarry. If the husband repudiates his wife for the third time, it triggers a "major" divorce (al-baynuna al-kubra), after which the couple cannot remarry without an intervening consummated marriage by the wife to another man.
  This is known as tahlil marriage or nikah halala. Making the third pronouncement irrevocable acts as a deterrent to rash repudiations.

There are hadith indicating that entering a tahleel marriage with the intention of divorcing so that the original spouses can remarry is forbidden (haraam). Abu Dawood and Ibn Majah reported that both the first husband (muhallil) and the temporary husband (muhallil lahu) were cursed by God, and Ibn Majah calls the temporary husband "a borrowed billy-goat". Al-Hakim Nishapuri adds that marriage should be based on genuine intentions, and that in the time of Muhammad, tahleel spouses would have been considered adulterers.

UK
A BBC report found that halala is practised in certain Pakistani Muslim communities in the UK. The report uncovered many instances where women were socially and sexually exploited by local religious figures.

India 

Petitions have been filed by a few Muslim women and rights organisations in the Supreme Court of India against nikah halala. Bharatiya Muslim Mahila Andolan (BMMA) is one such petitioner. BMMA is a national movement of Muslim women in India. In March 2018, the Supreme Court issued notice to the Indian government on the issue of nikah halala and polygamy. The Indian government made its stand clear in favor of criminalizing the practice of nikah halala in apex court.

The Supreme Court of India will hear the petition against nikah halala and polygamy in Muslim communities from July 20, 2018. On September 13, 2018, a Muslim woman named Shabnam Rani was attacked with acid. She was one of the petitioners against the practice of nikah halala. Islamic radicals are the main suspects. On September 18, 2018 the Supreme Court asked the government to provide adequate security to the victim.

The All India Muslim Personal Law Board is against the outlawing of Nikah Halala, though it feels that its use should be discouraged and restricted to the "rarest of rare situations".

Supreme  Court lawyer and BJP leader, Ashwini Upadhyay filed a writ petition in the Supreme Court of India against Nikah Halala and polygamy as violations of fundamental right to life and liberty.

Iran
Nikah halala and triple talaq are practiced among the Kurdish Sunni community of Iran. There has been pushback from women’s rights activists, lawyers and human rights activists.

In popular culture 
 1971 Persian language Iranian film Nikah Halala (1971 film)
 1982 Hindi language film Nikaah (film)
 2015 Hindi language short film Mister Come Tomorrow
 2016 Pakistani Urdu language TV series Hatheli (TV series)
 2017 Marathi language film Halal (film)
 2018 Hindi language film Ram Ki Janmabhoomi
 2019 Hindi language film Halala

See also 
 Divorce in Islam
 Islamic view of marriage
 Muslim Personal Law In India
 Nikah Halala (1971 film)
 Nikah misyar
 Nikah mut'ah

Bibliography 

 Salim, Arskal. Contemporary Islamic Law in Indonesia: Sharia and Legal Pluralism. United Kingdom, Edinburgh University Press, 2015.
 Bakabuang Phenomenon in Minangkabay Society:  A Covert Human Trafficking Action ~ Nelmawarni Nelmawarni  Kafaah Journal of Gender Studies Volume 11 No. 2 (2021)

References

Marriage in Islam
Islamic terminology